Erfurt  is the capital and largest city in the Central German state of Thuringia. It is located in the wide valley of the Gera river, in the southern part of the Thuringian Basin, north of the Thuringian Forest. It sits in the middle of an almost straight line of cities consisting of the six largest Thuringian cities forming the central metropolitan corridor of the state, the "Thuringian City Chain" (Thüringer Städtekette) with more than 500,000 inhabitants, stretching from Eisenach in the west, via Gotha, Erfurt, Weimar and Jena, to Gera in the east. Erfurt and the city of Göttingen in southern Lower Saxony are the two cities with more than 100,000 inhabitants closest to the geographic center of Germany.

Erfurt's old town is one of the best preserved medieval city centres in Germany. Tourist attractions include the Merchants' Bridge (Krämerbrücke), the Old Synagogue (Alte Synagoge), the oldest still standing synagogue in Europe, Cathedral Hill (Domberg) with the ensemble of Erfurt Cathedral (Erfurter Dom) and St Severus' Church (Severikirche) and Petersberg Citadel (Zitadelle Petersberg), one of the largest and best preserved town fortresses in Central Europe. The city's economy is based on agriculture, horticulture and microelectronics. Its central location has made it a logistics hub for Germany and central Europe. Erfurt hosts the second-largest trade fair in eastern Germany (after Leipzig), as well as the public television children's channel KiKa.

The city is situated on the Via Regia, a medieval trade and pilgrims' road network. Modern day Erfurt is also a hub for ICE high speed trains and other German and European transport networks. Erfurt was first mentioned in 742, as Saint Boniface founded the diocese. Although the town did not belong to any of the Thuringian states politically, it quickly became the economic centre of the region and it was a member of the Hanseatic League. It was part of the Electorate of Mainz during the Holy Roman Empire, and later became part of the Kingdom of Prussia in 1802. From 1949 until 1990 Erfurt was part of the German Democratic Republic (East Germany).

The University of Erfurt was founded in 1379, making it the first university to be established within the geographic area which constitutes modern-day Germany. It closed in 1816 and was re-established in 1994, with the main modern campus on what was a teachers' training college. Martin Luther (1483–1546) was its most famous student, studying there from 1501 before entering St Augustine's Monastery in 1505. Other noted Erfurters include the medieval philosopher and mystic Meister Eckhart (c. 1260–1328), the Baroque composer Johann Pachelbel (1653–1706) and the sociologist Max Weber (1864–1920).

History

Prehistory and antiquity 
Erfurt is an old Germanic settlement. The earliest evidence of human settlement dates from the prehistoric era; archaeological finds from the north of Erfurt revealed human traces from the paleolithic period, ca. 10,000 BCE.

To the west of Erfurt in Frienstedt existed, in the AD era, a big Germanic village, which was found during the construction of a highway. Where they also discovered the oldest Germanic word ever discovered in Central Germany written in runic script was found on a comb from a sacrificial shaft the word: "kaba". From Roman Times, however, they found 200 coins dating back to the third century, plus 150 Roman ceramic fragments and more than 200 fibulae. Also 11 inhumation graves of the Haßleben-Leuna group, which is an archeological cultural group.

The Melchendorf dig in the southern city part showed a settlement from the neolithic period. The Thuringii inhabited the Erfurt area in c. 480 and gave their name to Thuringia in c. 500.

Middle Ages 

The town is first mentioned in 742 under the name of "Erphesfurt": in that year, Saint Boniface wrote to Pope Zachary to inform him that he had established three dioceses in central Germany, one of them "in a place called Erphesfurt, which for a long time has been inhabited by pagan natives." All three dioceses (the other two were Würzburg and Büraburg) were confirmed by Zachary the next year, though in 755 Erfurt was brought into the diocese of Mainz. That the place was populous already is borne out by archeological evidence, which includes 23 graves and six horse burials from the sixth and seventh centuries.

Throughout the Middle Ages, Erfurt was an important trading town because of its location, near a ford across the Gera river. Together with the other five Thuringian woad towns of Gotha, Tennstedt, Arnstadt and Langensalza it was the centre of the German woad trade, which made those cities very wealthy. Erfurt was the junction of important trade routes: the Via Regia was one of the most used east–west roads between France and Russia (via Frankfurt, Erfurt, Leipzig and Wrocław) and another route in the north–south direction was the connection between the Baltic Sea ports (e. g. Lübeck) and the potent upper Italian city-states like Venice and Milan.

During the tenth and eleventh centuries both the Emperor and the Electorate of Mainz held some privileges in Erfurt. The German kings had an important monastery on Petersberg hill and the Archbishops of Mainz collected taxes from the people. Around 1100, some people became free citizens by paying the annual "" (liberation tax), which marks a first step in becoming an independent city. During the 12th century, as a sign of more and more independence, the citizens built a city wall around Erfurt (in the area of today's ). After 1200, independence was fulfilled and a city council was founded in 1217; the town hall was built in 1275. In the following decades, the council bought a city-owned territory around Erfurt which consisted at its height of nearly 100 villages and castles and even another small town (Sömmerda). Erfurt became an important regional power between the Landgraviate of Thuringia around, the Electorate of Mainz to the west and the Electorate of Saxony to the east. Between 1306 and 1481, Erfurt was allied with the two other major Thuringian cities (Mühlhausen and Nordhausen) in the Thuringian City Alliance and the three cities joined the Hanseatic League together in 1430. A peak in economic development was reached in the 15th century, when the city had a population of 20,000 making it one of the largest in Germany. Between 1432 and 1446, a second and higher city wall was established. In 1483, a first city fortress was built on Cyriaksburg hill in the southwestern part of the town.

In the year 1184, Erfurt was the location of a notable accident called the Erfurter Latrinensturz ('Erfurt latrine fall'). King Henry VI held council in a building of the Erfurt Cathedral to negotiate peace between two of his vassals, Archbishop Konrad I of Mainz and Landgrave Ludwig III of Thuringia. The amassed weight of all the gathered men proved too heavy for the floor to bear, which collapsed. According to contemporary accounts, dozens of people fell to their death into the latrine pit below. Ludwig III, Konrad I and Henry VI survived the affair.

The Jewish community of Erfurt was founded in the 11th century and became, together with Mainz, Worms and Speyer, one of the most influential in Germany. Their Old Synagogue is still extant and a museum today, as is the mikveh at Gera river near . In 1349, during the wave of Black Death Jewish persecutions across Europe, the Jews of Erfurt were rounded up, with more than 100 killed and the rest driven from the city. Before the persecution, a wealthy Jewish merchant buried his property in the basement of his house. In 1998, this treasure was found during construction works. The Erfurt Treasure with various gold and silver objects is shown in the exhibition in the synagogue today. Only a few years after 1349, the Jews moved back to Erfurt and founded a second community, which was disbanded by the city council in 1458.

In 1379, the University of Erfurt was founded. Some buildings of this old university are extant or restored in the "Latin Quarter" in the northern city centre (like , student dorms "" and others, the hospital and the church of the university). The university quickly became a hotspot of German cultural life in Renaissance humanism with scholars like Ulrich von Hutten, Helius Eobanus Hessus and Justus Jonas.

Early modern period 

In 1501 Martin Luther (1483–1546) moved to Erfurt and began his studies at the university. After 1505, he lived at St. Augustine's Monastery as a friar. In 1507 he was ordained as a priest in Erfurt Cathedral. He moved permanently to Wittenberg in 1511. Erfurt was an early adopter of the Protestant Reformation, in 1521.

In 1530, the city became one of the first in Europe to be officially bi-confessional with the Hammelburg Treaty. It kept that status through all the following centuries. The later 16th and the 17th century brought a slow economic decline of Erfurt. Trade shrank, the population was falling and the university lost its influence. The city's independence was endangered. In 1664, the city and surrounding area were brought under the dominion of the Electorate of Mainz and the city lost its independence. The Electorate built a huge fortress on Petersberg hill between 1665 and 1726 to control the city and instituted a governor to rule Erfurt.

In 1682 and 1683 Erfurt experienced the worst plague years in its history. In 1683 more than half of the population died because of the deadly disease.

In Erfurt witch-hunts are known from 1526 to 1705. Trial records are only incomplete. Twenty people were involved in witch trials and at least eight people died.

During the late 18th century, Erfurt saw another cultural peak. Governor Karl Theodor Anton Maria von Dalberg had close relations with Johann Wolfgang von Goethe, Friedrich Schiller, Johann Gottfried Herder, Christoph Martin Wieland and Wilhelm von Humboldt, who often visited him at his court in Erfurt.

Erfurt during the Napoleonic Wars 

Erfurt became part of the Kingdom of Prussia in 1802, to compensate for territories Prussia lost to France on the Left Bank of the Rhine. In the Capitulation of Erfurt, the city, its 12,000 Prussian and Saxon defenders under William VI, Prince of Orange-Nassau, 65 artillery pieces, and the Petersberg Citadel and Cyriaksburg Citadel Cyriaksburg, were handed over to the French on 16 October 1806. At the time of the capitulation, Joachim Murat, Marshal of France, had about 16,000 troops near Erfurt. With the attachment of the Saxe-Weimar territory of Blankenhain, the city became part of the First French Empire in 1806 as the Principality of Erfurt, directly subordinate to Napoleon as an "imperial state domain", separate from the Confederation of the Rhine, which the surrounding Thuringian states had joined. Napoleon first visited the principality on 23 July 1807, inspecting the citadels and fortifications. In 1808, the Congress of Erfurt was held with Napoleon and Alexander I of Russia visiting the city.

During their administration, the French introduced street lighting and a tax on foreign horses to pay for maintaining the road surface. The  suffered under the French occupation, with its inventory being auctioned off to other local churches – including the organ, bells and even the tower of the  chapel – and the former monastery's library being donated to the University of Erfurt (and then to the Boineburg Library when the university closed in 1816). Similarly the Cyriaksburg Citadel was damaged by the French, with the city-side walls being partially dismantled in the hunt for imagined treasures from the convent, workers being paid from the sale of the building materials.

In 1811, to commemorate the birth of the Prince Imperial, a  ceremonial column of wood and plaster was erected on the common.

With the Sixth Coalition forming after French defeat in Russia, on 24 February 1813 Napoleon ordered the Petersburg Citadel to prepare for siege, visiting the city on 25 April to inspect the fortifications, in particular both Citadels. On 10 July 1813, Napoleon put , baron of the Empire, in charge of the defences of Erfurt.

Within a week of the Sixth Coalition's decisive victory at Leipzig (16–19 October 1813), however, Erfurt was besieged by Prussian, Austrian and Russian troops under the command of Prussian Lt Gen von Kleist. After a call for volunteers 3 days later, 300 Erfurters joined the Coalition armies in France. Finally, in May 1814, the French capitulated fully, with 1,700 French troops vacating the Petersberg and Cyriaksburg fortresses. During the two and a half months of siege, the mortality rate rose in the city greatly; 1,564 Erfurt citizens died in 1813, around a thousand more than the previous year.

After the Congress of Vienna, Erfurt was restored to Prussia on 21 June 1815, becoming the capital of one of the three districts of the new Province of Saxony, but some southern and eastern parts of Erfurter lands joined Blankenhain in being transferred to the Grand Duchy of Saxe-Weimar-Eisenach the following September. Although enclosed by Thuringian territory in the west, south and east, the city remained part of the Prussian Province of Saxony until 1944.

Since 1815 
 

After the 1848 Revolution, many Germans desired to have a united national state. An attempt in this direction was the failed Erfurt Union of German states in 1850.

The Industrial Revolution reached Erfurt in the 1840s, when the Thuringian Railway connecting Berlin and Frankfurt was built. During the following years, many factories in different sectors were founded. One of the biggest was the "Royal Gun Factory of Prussia" in 1862. After the Unification of Germany in 1871, Erfurt moved from the southern border of Prussia to the centre of Germany, so the fortifications of the city were no longer needed. The demolition of the city fortifications in 1873 led to a construction boom in Erfurt, because it was now possible to build in the area formerly occupied by the city walls and beyond. Many public and private buildings emerged and the infrastructure (such as a tramway, hospitals, and schools) improved rapidly. The number of inhabitants grew from 40,000 around 1870 to 130,000 in 1914 and the city expanded in all directions.

The "Erfurt Program" was adopted by the Social Democratic Party of Germany during its congress at Erfurt in 1891.

Between the wars, the city kept growing. Housing shortages were fought with building programmes and social infrastructure was broadened according to the welfare policy in the Weimar Republic. The Great Depression between 1929 and 1932 led to a disaster for Erfurt, nearly one out of three became unemployed. Conflicts between far-left and far-right-oriented milieus increased and many inhabitants supported the new Nazi government and Adolf Hitler. Others, especially some communist workers, put up resistance against the new administration. Jews lost their property and emigrated or were deported to Nazi concentration camps (together with many communists). In 1914, the company Topf and Sons began the manufacture of crematoria later becoming the market leader in this industry. Under the Nazis, JA Topf & Sons supplied specially developed crematoria, ovens and associated plants to the Auschwitz-Birkenau, Buchenwald and Mauthausen-Gusen concentration camps. On 27 January 2011 a memorial and museum dedicated to the Holocaust victims was opened at the former company premises in Erfurt.

During World War II, Erfurt experienced more than 27 British and American air raids, about 1600 civilians died. Bombed as a target of the Oil Campaign of World War II, Erfurt suffered only limited damage and was captured on 12 April 1945, by the US 80th Infantry Division. On 3 July, American troops left the city, which then became part of the Soviet Zone of Occupation and eventually of the German Democratic Republic (East Germany). In 1948, Erfurt became the capital of Thuringia, replacing Weimar. Erfurt then became the capital of a new "" (district).

On 19 March 1970, the East and West German heads of government Willi Stoph and Willy Brandt met in Erfurt, the first such meeting since the division of Germany. During the 1970s and 1980s, as the economic situation in GDR worsened, many old buildings in city centre decayed, while the government fought against the housing shortage by building large  settlements in the periphery. The Peaceful Revolution of 1989/1990 led to German reunification.

With the re-formation of the state of Thuringia in 1990, the city became the state capital. After reunification, a deep economic crisis occurred in Eastern Germany. Many factories closed and many people lost their jobs and moved to the former West Germany. At the same time, many buildings were redeveloped and the infrastructure improved massively. In 1994, the new university was opened, as was the Fachhochschule in 1991. Between 2005 and 2008, the economic situation improved as the unemployment rate decreased and new enterprises developed. In addition, the population began to increase once again.

A school shooting occurred on 26 April 2002 at the Gutenberg-Gymnasium.

Since the 1990s, organized crime has gained a foothold in Erfurt, with several mafia groups, including the Armenian mafia present in the city. Among other events, there has been a robbery and an arson attack targeting the gastronomy sector and in 2014 there was a shoot-out in an open street.

Geography and demographics

Topography 
Erfurt is situated in the south of the Thuringian basin, a fertile agricultural area between the Harz mountains  to the north and the Thuringian forest  to the southwest. Whereas the northern parts of the city area are flat, the southern ones consist of hilly landscape up to 430 m of elevation. To the east and to the west are some non-forested hills so that the Gera river valley within the town forms a basin. North of the city are some gravel pits in operation, while others are abandoned, flooded and used as leisure areas.

Climate 
Erfurt has a humid continental climate (Dfb) or an oceanic climate (Cfb) according to the Köppen climate classification system. The city's topography creates a microclimate caused by the location inside a basin with sometimes inversion in winter (quite cold nights under ) and inadequate air circulation in summer. Annual precipitation is only  with moderate rainfall throughout the year. Light snowfall mainly occurs from December through February, but snow cover does not usually remain for long.

Administrative divisions 

Erfurt abuts the districts of Sömmerda (municipalities Witterda, Elxleben, Walschleben, Riethnordhausen, Nöda, Alperstedt, Großrudestedt, Udestedt, Kleinmölsen and Großmölsen) in the north, Weimarer Land (municipalities Niederzimmern, Nohra, Mönchenholzhausen and Klettbach) in the east, Ilm-Kreis (municipalities Kirchheim, Rockhausen and Amt Wachsenburg) in the south and Gotha (municipalities Nesse-Apfelstädt, Nottleben, Zimmernsupra and Bienstädt) in the west.

The city itself is divided into 53 districts.

Finally, there are many villages with an average population of approximately 1,000 which were incorporated during the 20th century; however, they have mostly stayed rural to date:

 Alach (incorporated 1994)
 Azmannsdorf (1994)
 Bindersleben (1950)
 Bischleben-Stedten (1950)
 Büßleben (1994)
 Dittelstedt (1994)
 Egstedt (1994) 
 Ermstedt (1994)
 Frienstedt (1994)
 Gispersleben (1950)
 Gottstedt (1994)
 Hochheim (1938)
 Hochstedt (1994)
 Kerspleben (1994)
 Kühnhausen (1994)
 Linderbach (1994)
 Marbach (1950)
 Mittelhausen (1994)
 Möbisburg-Rhoda (1950)
 Molsdorf (1994)
 Niedernissa (1994)
 Rohda (1994)
 Salomonsborn (1994)
 Schaderode (1994)
 Schmira (1950)
 Schwerborn (1994)
 Stotternheim (1994)
 Tiefthal (1994)
 Töttelstädt (1994)
 Töttleben (1994)
 Urbich (1994)
 Vieselbach (1994)
 Wallichen (1994)
 Waltersleben (1994)
 Windischholzhausen (1994)

Demographics 

Around the year 1500, the city had 18,000 inhabitants and was one of the largest cities in the Holy Roman Empire. The population then more or less stagnated until the 19th century. The population of Erfurt was 21,000 in 1820, and increased to 32,000 in 1847, the year of rail connection as industrialization began. In the following decades Erfurt grew up to 130,000 at the beginning of World War I and 190,000 inhabitants in 1950. A maximum was reached in 1988 with 220,000 persons. The bad economic situation in eastern Germany after the reunification resulted in a decline in population, which fell to 200,000 in 2002 before rising again to 206,000 in 2011. The average growth of population between 2009 and 2012 was approximately 0.68% p. a, whereas the population in bordering rural regions is shrinking with accelerating tendency. Suburbanization played only a small role in Erfurt. It occurred after reunification for a short time in the 1990s, but most of the suburban areas were situated within the administrative city borders.

The birth deficit was 200 in 2012, this is −1.0 per 1,000 inhabitants (Thuringian average: -4.5; national average: -2.4). The net migration rate was +8.3 per 1,000 inhabitants in 2012 (Thuringian average: -0.8; national average: +4.6). The most important regions of origin of Erfurt migrants are rural areas of Thuringia, Saxony-Anhalt and Saxony as well as foreign countries like Poland, Russia, Syria, Afghanistan and Hungary.

Like other eastern German cities, foreigners account only for a small share of Erfurt's population: circa 3.0% are non-Germans by citizenship and overall 5.9% are migrants (according to the 2011 EU census).

Due to the official atheism of the former GDR, most of the population is non-religious. 14.8% are members of the Evangelical Church in Central Germany and 6.8% are Catholics (according to the 2011 EU census). The Jewish Community consists of 500 members. Most of them migrated to Erfurt from Russia and Ukraine in the 1990s.

Culture, sights and cityscape

Residents notable in cultural history 

The theologian, philosopher and mystic Meister Eckhart (c. 1260–1328) entered the Dominican monastery in Erfurt when he was aged about 18 (around 1275). Eckhart was the Dominican prior at Erfurt from 1294 until 1298, and Vicar of Thuringia from 1298 to 1302. After a year in Paris, he returned to Erfurt in 1303 and administered his duties as Provincial of Saxony from there until 1311.

Martin Luther (1483–1546) studied law and philosophy at the University of Erfurt from 1501. He lived in St Augustine's Monastery in Erfurt, as a friar from 1505 to 1511.

Pachelbel composed approximately seventy pieces for organ while in Erfurt.

The city is the birthplace of one of Johann Sebastian Bach's cousins, Johann Bernhard Bach, as well as Johann Sebastian Bach's father Johann Ambrosius Bach.

Alexander Müller (1808–1863), pianist, conductor and composer, was born in Erfurt. He later moved to Zürich where he served as leader of the General Music Society's subscription concerts series.

Max Weber (1864–1920) was born in Erfurt. He was a sociologist, philosopher, lawyer, and political economist whose ideas have profoundly influenced modern social theory and social research.

After 1906 the composer Richard Wetz (1875–1935) lived in Erfurt and became the leading person in the city's musical life. His major works were written here, including three symphonies, a Requiem and a Christmas Oratorio.

The textile designer Margaretha Reichardt (1907–1984) was born and died in Erfurt. She studied at the Bauhaus from 1926 to 1930, and while there worked with Marcel Breuer on his innovative chair designs. Her former home and weaving workshop in Erfurt, the Margaretha Reichardt Haus, is now a museum, managed by the Angermuseum Erfurt.

Famous contemporary musicians from Erfurt are Clueso, the Boogie Pimps and Yvonne Catterfeld.

Museums 
Erfurt has a great variety of museums:

 The  (municipal museum) shows aspects of Erfurt's history with a focus on the Middle Ages, early modern history, Martin Luther and the university.
 The  (Old Synagogue) is one of the oldest synagogue buildings in Europe. It is now a museum of local Jewish history. It houses facsimiles of medieval Hebrew manuscripts and the Erfurt Treasure, a hoard of coins and goldsmiths' work that is assumed to have belonged to Jews who hid them in 1349 at the time of the Black Death pogroms.
 The  (Topf and Sons memorial) is on the site of the factory of the company which constructed crematoria for Auschwitz and other concentration camps. Its exhibitions explore the collaboration of a civilian company with the National Socialist regime in the holocaust.
 Memorial and Education Centre Andreasstrasse, (Stasi Museum). On the site of the former Erfurt Stasi prison, where over 5000 people were held. On 4 December 1989, the building was occupied by local residents. It was the first of many such takeovers of Stasi buildings in the former East Germany. Today it has exhibitions on the history of East Germany and the activities of its regime.
 The Angermuseum is one of the main art museums of Erfurt, named after Anger Square, where it is located. It focuses on modern graphic arts, medieval sculpture and early modern artisanal handicraft.
 The  (Erfurt City Art Gallery) has exhibitions of contemporary art, of local, national and international artists. 
 The Margaretha Reichardt Haus is the home and workshop of the textile designer and former Bauhaus student, Margaretha Reichardt (1907–1984). 
 The  (Saint Peter's church) houses an exhibition of concrete art, i.e. totally abstract art (not art made out of concrete).
 The  (German Horticulture Museum) is housed at the Cyriaksburg Citadel. 
 The  (Natural History Museum) is situated in a medieval woad warehouse and explores Thuringian flora and fauna, geology and ecology. 
 The  (Museum of Folk Art and Cultural Anthropology) looks at the ordinary life of people in Thuringia in the past and shows exhibits of peasant and artisan traditions. 
 The  (Museum of Electrical Engineering) shows the history of electric engines, which have featured prominently in Erfurt's economy. 
  in the district of Molsdorf is a Baroque palace with an exhibition about the painter .

Image gallery

Theatre 
Since 2003, the modern opera house is home to Theater Erfurt and its Philharmonic Orchestra. The "grand stage" section has 800 seats and the "studio stage" can hold 200 spectators. In September 2005, the opera Waiting for the Barbarians by Philip Glass premiered in the opera house. The Erfurt Theatre has been a source of controversy. In 2005, a performance of Engelbert Humperdinck's opera  stirred up the local press since the performance contained suggestions of pedophilia and incest. The opera was advertised in the programme with the addition "for adults only".

On 12 April 2008, a version of Verdi's opera  directed by Johann Kresnik opened at the Erfurt Theatre. The production stirred deep controversy by featuring nude performers in Mickey Mouse masks dancing on the ruins of the World Trade Center and a female singer with a painted on Hitler toothbrush moustache performing a straight arm Nazi salute, along with sinister portrayals of American soldiers, Uncle Sam, and Elvis Presley impersonators. The director described the production as a populist critique of modern American society, aimed at showing up the disparities between rich and poor. The controversy prompted one local politician to call for locals to boycott the performances, but this was largely ignored and the première was sold out.

Sport 

The Messe Erfurt serves as home court for the Oettinger Rockets, a professional basketball team in Germany's first division, the Basketball Bundesliga.

Notable types of sport in Erfurt are athletics, ice skating, cycling (with the oldest velodrome in use in the world, opened in 1885), swimming, handball, volleyball, tennis and football. The  was the second indoor speed skating arena in Germany.

Cityscape 

Erfurt's cityscape features a medieval core of narrow, curved alleys in the centre surrounded by a belt of  architecture, created between 1873 and 1914. In 1873, the city's fortifications were demolished and it became possible to build houses in the area in front of the former city walls. In the following years, Erfurt saw a construction boom. In the northern area (districts Andreasvorstadt, Johannesvorstadt and Ilversgehofen) tenements for the factory workers were built whilst the eastern area (Krämpfervorstadt and Daberstedt) featured apartments for white-collar workers and clerks and the southwestern part (Löbervorstadt and Brühlervorstadt) with its beautiful valley landscape saw the construction of villas and mansions of rich factory owners and notables.

During the interwar period, some settlements in Bauhaus style were realized, often as housing cooperatives.

After World War II and over the whole GDR period, housing shortages remained a problem even though the government started a big apartment construction programme. Between 1970 and 1990 large  settlements with high-rise blocks on the northern (for 50,000 inhabitants) and southeastern (for 40,000 inhabitants) periphery were constructed. After reunification the renovation of old houses in city centre and the  areas was a big issue. The federal government granted substantial subsidies, so that many houses could be restored.

Compared to many other German cities, little of Erfurt was destroyed in World War II. This is one reason why the centre today offers a mixture of medieval, Baroque and Neoclassical architecture as well as buildings from the last 150 years.

Sights and architectural heritage

Churches, monasteries and synagogues 

The city centre has about 25 churches and monasteries, most of them in Gothic style, some also in Romanesque style or a mixture of Romanesque and Gothic elements, and a few in later styles. The various steeples characterize the medieval centre and led to one of Erfurt's nicknames as the "Thuringian Rome".

Catholic churches and monasteries
 The  (St Mary's Cathedral) perches above , the Cathedral Square. It is the episcopal see and one of the main sights of Erfurt. It combines Romanesque and Gothic elements and has the largest free-swinging medieval bell in the world, which is named Gloriosa. One of the works of art inside the cathedral is Lucas Cranach the Elder's 'The Mystic Marriage of St. Catherine' painted around 1520.
 The  (St Lawrence's Church) is a small 14th-century Gothic parish church at  Square.
 The  (St Martin's Church) was built in the 15th century in Gothic style and in 1755–58 converted to Baroque style.
Until 1285, it was used by a convent of Augustinian nuns.
 The  (Scots Monks' Church of St Nicholas and St James) is an 11th-century Romanesque monastery church with a Baroque façade, which was later used as a parish church.
 The  (St Severus' Church) is the second-largest parish church after the cathedral and stands next to it on the  hill. It is in Gothic style and was built around 1300.
 The , St Ursula's Church, is a Gothic church at  Square. It is the only medieval monastery or nunnery in Erfurt which has been in continuous operation since it opened.
 The  (St Wigbert's Church) is a 15th-century Gothic church near  Square.

Protestant churches and monasteries
  (St Giles' Church) is a 14th-century Gothic parish church at  Square. It is the surviving one of formerly two bridge-head churches of the  located on both ends of the bridge. As a result, the nave is on the first floor, while on ground level is a passage to the bridge. The steeple is open to the public and offers a good view over the city centre. Today, St Giles' Church is a Methodist parish church.
The old craftsmen's quarter around it is named  after the church.
  (St Augustine's Monastery) dates from 1277. Martin Luther lived there as a monk between 1505 and 1511. The site has had a varied history and the restored complex has both modern and medieval buildings. Today it belongs to the Evangelical Church in Germany and as well as being a place of worship it is also a meeting and conference centre, and provides simple guest accommodation. In 2016, an application was made for it to be included in the already existing UNESCO World Heritage Site "Luther sites in Central Germany".
 The  (Merchant's Church of St Gregory) is a 14th-century Gothic parish church at  square. It is one of the largest and most important original parish churches in Erfurt. The parents of Johann Sebastian Bach, Johann Ambrosius Bach and Maria Elisabeth Lämmerhirt, married here in 1668.
It became the church of the university in 1392. Erfurt's first Protestant sermon was preached here in 1521. The church tower contains Erfurt's oldest bell "Katharina", dating from 1380.
Since the Reformation in the 16th century, it is the main Protestant church of Erfurt and furthermore one of the largest former churches of the mendicant orders in Germany. The theologian and mystic Meister Eckhart (c. 1260–1328) entered Prediger Monastery around 1275. He was Prior from 1294 until 1298, and Vicar of Thuringia from 1298 to 1302. After a year in Paris, he returned to the monastery in 1303 and administered his duties as Provincial of Saxony from there until 1311. The baroque composer Johann Pachelbel (1653–1706) was organist at the church from 1678 until 1690.
After the Reformation, it became a Protestant parish church.

Former churches
The former Franciscan monastery became a Protestant parish church after the Reformation. In 1944, the church was severely damaged by Allied bombing. Its high choir was restored, but the nave's ruins have been preserved as a war memorial.
 The  (St Bartholomew's Church) was a Gothic parish church at  Square. The church was demolished in 1715 and only the steeple remained. Today, the tower hosts a carillon with 60 bells.
 The  (St George's Church) was a parish church in Michaelisstraße. It was demolished in 1632 and only the church tower now remains. 
It is a 14th-century Gothic building and is used today as a depot by the Museum für Thüringer Volkskunde (Museum of Thuringian Ethnology).
 The  (St John's Church) was a parish church at John's Street. It was demolished in 1819, but the steeple remained. 
The Baroque church was closed in 1803 and afterwards used for many different purposes. Today, it is part of a housing complex. 
 The  (St Nicholas' Church) was a parish church in Augustine's Street. It was demolished in 1747 and only the steeple remained. 
 The  (St Paul's Church) was a parish church in Paul's Street. It was demolished before 1759. The steeple remains and is in use as the belfry of the Prediger Church. 
 The  (St Peter's Church) was built in the 12th century in Romanesque style as a church of the Benedictine monastery of St Peter and Paul on Petersberg hill, now the site of Petersberg Citadel. It was secularised in 1803 and used as a military store house. Today it houses an art gallery.

Synagogues
The oldest parts of Erfurt's Alte Synagoge (Old Synagogue) date to the 11th century. It was used until 1349 when the Jewish community was destroyed in a pogrom known as the Erfurt Massacre. The building had many other uses since then. It was conserved in the 1990s and in 2009 it became a museum of Jewish history. A rare Mikveh, a ritual bath, dating from c.1250, was discovered by archeologists in 2007. It has been accessible to visitors on guided tours since September 2011. In 2015 the Old Synagogue and Mikveh were nominated as a World Heritage Site. It has been tentatively listed but a final decision has not yet been made.

As religious freedom was granted in the 19th century, some Jews returned to Erfurt. They built their synagogue on the banks of the Gera river and used it from 1840 until 1884. The neoclassical building is known as the Kleine Synagoge (Small Synagogue). Today it is used an events centre. It is also open to visitors.

A larger synagogue, the Große Synagoge (Great Synagogue), was opened in 1884 because the community had become larger and wealthier.

In 1947 the land which the Great Synagogue had occupied was returned to the Jewish community and they built their current place of worship, the Neue Synagoge (New Synagogue) which opened in 1952. It was the only synagogue building erected under communist rule in East Germany.

Secular architecture 
Besides the religious buildings there is a lot of historic secular architecture in Erfurt, mostly concentrated in the city centre, but some 19th- and 20th-century buildings are located on the outskirts.

Street and square ensembles
 The  (Merchants' bridge) is the most famous tourist attraction of Erfurt. This 15th-century bridge is completely covered with dwellings and unique in Europe north of the Alps. Today, there are some art handicraft and souvenir shops in the houses.
 The  (Cathedral Square) is the largest square in Erfurt and one of the largest historical market squares in Germany. On the north side lies the courthouse, a historic building from 1880. The eastern and southern side is fronted by early-modern patrician houses. On the square are the Minerva Fountain from 1784 and the Erthal Obelisk from 1777. The Domplatz is the main setting of the Erfurt Christmas Market in December and the location for "DomStufen-Festival", an open-air theatre festival in summer. 
 The  (Fish Market) is the central square of Erfurt's city centre. It is surrounded by renaissance-style patrician houses and the town hall, a neo-gothic building from 1882. In the middle of the square is a statue called  (Roman), a symbol of the city's independence, erected by the citizens in 1591. 
 The  (Minor Market) is a small square on the east side of the Gera river (opposite to the Fischmarkt on the west side), surrounded by early-modern patrician and merchants' houses. The fountain on this square with the sculpture "Scuffling Boys" was created in 1975. Today,  square also has various cafés and bars. The Congress of Erfurt took place here in 1808. 
 The  (originally the German term for "village green") is a protracted square in the eastern city centre. All tram lines are linked here, so that it became the new city centre during the 20th century with many important buildings. On its northern side is the main post office, built in 1886 in neo-gothic style with its prominent clock tower. In the north-east there is the Martin Luther monument from 1889 in front of the Merchants' Church. Between the church and the Ursuline monastery lies the "Anger 1" department store from 1908. The western part of Anger square is surrounded by large historicist business houses from the late 19th century. The west end of the square is marked by the Angerbrunnen fountain from 1890. The Jesuit College near  was built in 1737 and used until the ban of the Jesuits in 1773.
 The Willy Brandt Square is the southern gate to the city centre in front of the main station. Opposite to the station is the former hotel , where the first meeting of the East- and West-German heads of government took place in 1970. On the western side is the building of the old Erfurt station (1847–95) with a clock tower and the former offices of the Thuringian Railway Company. 
 The  (Deer Garden) is a small park in front of the Thuringian government seat in the western city centre.
 The  (Michael's Street) is known as "the lithic chronicle of Erfurt", because of its mostly medieval buildings. It is the main street of the Latin quarter around the old university and today one of the favourite nightlife districts of the Erfurters with various bars, restaurants and cafés. The central building of the old university, was built in 1515, destroyed by Allied bombs in 1945 and originally rebuilt in 1999.
 The  is an inner-city circular road following the former inner city wall. The road was set out in the 1890s by closing a branch of the Gera river. The buildings along the street originate from all periods of the 20th century, including some GDR-era highrise residence buildings. An old building complex here is the former Great Hospital, established in the 14th century. Today, it hosts the museum of popular art and cultural anthropology. 
It was the former craftsmen quarter with narrow alleys and old (16th/17th century) little houses. During the 20th century, there were plans to demolish the quarter because of its bad housing conditions. After 1990, the houses were redeveloped by private individuals so that it is one of the favourite neighbourhoods today.

Fortifications

From 1066 until 1873 the old town of Erfurt was encircled by a fortified wall. About 1168 this was extended to run around the western side of Petersberg hill, enclosing it within the city boundaries.

After German Unification in 1871, Erfurt became part of the newly created German Empire. The threat to the city from its Saxon neighbours and from Bavaria was no longer present, so it was decided to dismantle the city walls. Only a few remnants remain today. A piece of inner wall can be found in a small park at the corner Juri-Gagarin-Ring and Johannesstraße and another piece at the flood ditch (Flutgraben) near Franckestraße. There is also a small restored part of the wall in the Brühler Garten, behind the Catholic orphanage. Only one of the wall's fortified towers was left standing, on Boyneburgufer, but this was destroyed in an air raid in 1944.

The Petersberg Citadel is one of the largest and best preserved city fortresses in Europe, covering an area of 36 hectares in the north-west of the city centre. It was built from 1665 on Petersberg hill and was in military use until 1963. Since 1990, it has been significantly restored and is now open to the public as an historic site.

The  is a smaller citadel south-west of the city centre, dating from 1480. Today, it houses the German horticulture museum.

19th- and 20th-century architecture in the outskirts
Between 1873 and 1914, a belt of  architecture emerged around the city centre.

The "Mühlenviertel" ("mill quarter"), is an area of beautiful Art Nouveau apartment buildings, cobblestone streets and street trees just to the north of the old city, in the vicinity of Nord Park, bordered by the Gera river on its east side. The Schmale Gera stream runs through the area. In the Middle Ages numerous small enterprises using the power of water mills occupied the area, hence the name "Mühlenviertel", with street names such as Waidmühlenweg (woad, or indigo, mill way), Storchmühlenweg (stork mill way) and Papiermühlenweg (paper mill way).

A new use has not been found yet, but the area is sometimes used as a location in movie productions because of its atmosphere.

While the  building (1930s) represents more the neo-Roman/fascist style,  (1940s) is marked by some neo-Germanic  style elements.

The current international glass and steel architecture is dominant among most larger new buildings like the Federal Labour Court of Germany (1999), the new opera house (2003), the new main station (2007), the university library, the Erfurt Messe (convention centre) and the  ice rink.

Economy and infrastructure 
During recent years, the economic situation of the city improved: the unemployment rate declined from 21% in 2005 to 9% in 2013. Nevertheless, some 14,000 households with 24,500 persons (12% of population) are dependent upon state social benefits (Hartz IV).

Agriculture, industry and services 

Farming has a great tradition in Erfurt: the cultivation of woad made the city rich during the Middle Ages. Today, horticulture and the production of flower seeds is still an important business in Erfurt. There is also growing of fruits (like apples, strawberries and sweet cherries), vegetables (e.g. cauliflowers, potatoes, cabbage and sugar beets) and grain on more than 60% of the municipal territory.

Industrialization in Erfurt started around 1850. Until World War I, many factories were founded in different sectors like engine building, shoes, guns, malt and later electro-technics, so that there was no industrial monoculture in the city. After 1945, the companies were nationalized by the GDR government, which led to the decline of some of them. After reunification, nearly all factories were closed, either because they failed to successfully adopt to a free market economy or because the German government sold them to west German businessmen who closed them to avoid competition to their own enterprises. However, in the early 1990s the federal government started to subsidize the foundation of new companies. It still took a long time before the economic situation stabilized around 2006. Since this time, unemployment has decreased and overall, new jobs were created. Today, there are many small and medium-sized companies in Erfurt with electro-technics, semiconductors and photovoltaics in focus. Engine production, food production, the Braugold brewery, and Born Feinkost, a producer of Thuringian mustard, remain important industries.

Such centres are always hubs of service businesses and public services like hospitals, universities, research, trade fairs, retail etc. Additionally, Erfurt is the capital of the federal state of Thuringia, so that there are many institutions of administration like all the Thuringian state ministries and some nationwide authorities. Typical for Erfurt are the logistic business with many distribution centres of big companies, the Erfurt Trade Fair and the media sector with KiKa and MDR as public broadcast stations. A growing industry is tourism, due to the various historical sights of Erfurt. There are 4,800 hotel beds and (in 2012) 450,000 overnight visitors spent a total of 700,000 nights in hotels. Nevertheless, most tourists are one-day visitors from Germany. The Christmas Market in December attracts some 2,000,000 visitors each year.

Transport

By rail 
The ICE railway network puts Erfurt 1 hours from Berlin, 2 hours from Frankfurt, 2 hours from Dresden, and 45 minutes from Leipzig. In 2017, the ICE line to Munich opened, making the trip to Erfurt main station only 2 hours.

There are regional trains from Erfurt to Weimar, Jena, Gotha, Eisenach, Bad Langensalza, Magdeburg, Nordhausen, Göttingen, Mühlhausen, Würzburg, Meiningen, Ilmenau, Arnstadt, and Gera.

In freight transport there is an intermodal terminal in the district of Vieselbach with connections to rail and the autobahn.

By road 
The two Autobahnen crossing each other nearby at Erfurter Kreuz are the Bundesautobahn 4 (Frankfurt–Dresden) and the Bundesautobahn 71 (Schweinfurt–Sangerhausen). Together with the east tangent both motorways form a circle road around the city and lead the interregional traffic around the centre. Whereas the A 4 was built in the 1930s, the A 71 came into being after the reunification in the 1990s and 2000s. In addition to both motorways there are two Bundesstraßen: the Bundesstraße 7 connects Erfurt parallel to A 4 with Gotha in the west and Weimar in the east. The Bundesstraße 4 is a connection between Erfurt and Nordhausen in the north. Its southern part to Coburg was annulled when A 71 was finished (in this section, the A 71 now effectively serves as B 4). Within the circle road, B 7 and B 4 are also annulled, so that the city government has to pay for maintenance instead of the German federal government. The access to the city is restricted as  since 2012 for some vehicles. Large parts of the inner city are a pedestrian area which can not be reached by car (except for residents).

By light rail and bus 

The Erfurt public transport system is marked by the area-wide  (light rail) network, established as a tram system in 1883, upgraded to a light rail system in 1997, and continually expanded and upgraded through the 2000s. Today, there are six Stadtbahn lines running every ten minutes on every light rail route.

Additionally, Erfurt operates a bus system, which connects the sparsely populated outer districts of the region to the city center. Both systems are organized by SWE EVAG, a transit company owned by the city administration. Trolleybuses were in service in Erfurt from 1948 until 1975, but are no longer in service.

By airplane 
It is linked to the central train station via Stadtbahn (tram). It was significantly extended in the 1990s, with flights mostly to Mediterranean holiday destinations and to London during the peak Christmas market tourist season. Connections to longer haul flights are easily accessible via Frankfurt Airport, which can be reached in 2 hours via a direct train from Frankfurt Airport to Erfurt, and from Leipzig/Halle Airport, which can be reached within half an hour.

By bike 
Biking is becoming increasingly popular since construction of high quality cycle tracks began in the 1990s. There are cycle lanes for general commuting within Erfurt city.

The former runs along the Gera river valley from the Thuringian forest to the river Unstrut; the latter follows the medieval Via Regia from Eisenach to Altenburg via Gotha, Erfurt, Weimar, and Jena.

The Rennsteig Cycle Way was opened in 2000. This designated high-grade hiking and bike trail runs along the ridge of the Thuringian Central Uplands. It is therefore about  longer than the hiking trail.

The Rennsteig is connected to the E3 European long distance path, which goes from the Atlantic coast of Spain to the Black Sea coast of Bulgaria, and the E6 European long distance path, running from Arctic Finland to Turkey.

Education 
After reunification, the educational system was reorganized. The University of Erfurt, founded in 1379 and closed in 1816, was refounded in 1994 with a focus on social sciences, modern languages, humanities and teacher training. Today there are approximately 6,000 students working within four faculties, the Max Weber Center for Advanced Cultural and Social Studies, and three academic research institutes. The university has an international reputation and participates in international student exchange programmes.

The Fachhochschule Erfurt, is a university of applied sciences, founded in 1991, which offers a combination of academic training and practical experience in subjects such as social work and social pedagogy, business studies, and engineering. There are nearly 5,000 students in six faculties, of which the faculty of landscaping and horticulture has a national reputation.

The International University of Applied Sciences Bad Honnef – Bonn (IUBH), is a privately run university with a focus on business and economics. It merged with the former Adam-Ries-Fachhochschule in 2013.

The buildings are now part of a World Heritage Site and are today used by the Bauhaus-Universität Weimar, which teaches design, arts, media and technology related subjects.

Furthermore, there are eight , six state-owned, one Catholic and one Protestant (Evangelisches Ratsgymnasium Erfurt). Another state-owned school, offers a focus in sciences as an elite boarding school in addition to the common curriculum.

Media 

The German national public television children's channel KiKa is based in Erfurt.

MDR, Mitteldeutscher Rundfunk, a radio and television company, has a broadcast centre and studios in Erfurt.

The Thüringer Allgemeine is a statewide newspaper that is headquartered in the city.

Politics

Mayor and city council 

The first freely elected mayor after German reunification was Manfred Ruge of the Christian Democratic Union, who served from 1990 to 2006. Since 2006, Andreas Bausewein of the Social Democratic Party (SPD) has been mayor. The most recent mayoral election was held on 15 April 2018, with a runoff held on 29 April, and the results were as follows:

! rowspan=2 colspan=2| Candidate
! rowspan=2| Party
! colspan=2| First round
! colspan=2| Second round
|-
! Votes
! %
! Votes
! %
|-
| bgcolor=| 
| align=left| Andreas Bausewein
| align=left| Social Democratic Party
| 25,450
| 30.4
| 35,432
| 58.5
|-
| bgcolor=| 
| align=left| Marion Walsmann
| align=left| Christian Democratic Union
| 18,348
| 21.9
| 25,118
| 41.5
|-
| bgcolor=| 
| align=left| Stefan Möller
| align=left| Alternative for Germany
| 12,077
| 14.4
|-
| bgcolor=| 
| align=left| Karola Stange
| align=left| The Left
| 9,312
| 11.1
|-
| 
| align=left| Sebastian Perdelwitz
| align=left| Better City Erfurt
| 7,963
| 9.5
|-
| bgcolor=| 
| align=left| Alexander Thumfart
| align=left| Alliance 90/The Greens
| 5,323
| 6.4
|-
| 
| align=left| Daniel Stassny
| align=left| Free Voters / Pirate Party
| 3,519
| 4.2
|-
| bgcolor=| 
| align=left| Marko Enke
| align=left| Free Democratic Party
| 1,709
| 2.0
|-
! colspan=3| Valid votes
! 83,701
! 99.3
! 60,550
! 98.0
|-
! colspan=3| Invalid votes
! 562
! 0.7
! 1,240
! 2.0
|-
! colspan=3| Total
! 84,263
! 100.0
! 61,790
! 100.0
|-
! colspan=3| Electorate/voter turnout
! 172,908
! 48.7
! 172,562
! 35.8
|-
| colspan=7| Source: Wahlen in Thüringen
|}

The most recent city council election was held on 26 May 2019, and the results were as follows:

! colspan=2| Party
! Lead candidate
! Votes
! %
! +/-
! Seats
! +/-
|-
| bgcolor=| 
| align=left| Christian Democratic Union (CDU)
| align=left| Michael Panse
| 56,789
| 19.6
|  5.1
| 10
|  2
|-
| bgcolor=| 
| align=left| Social Democratic Party (SPD)
| align=left| Andreas Bausewein
| 49,627
| 17.1
|  11.6
| 9
|  6
|-
| bgcolor=| 
| align=left| The Left (Die Linke)
| align=left| Matthias Bärwolff
| 47,742
| 16.5
|  5.5
| 8
|  3
|-
| bgcolor=| 
| align=left| Alternative for Germany (AfD)
| align=left| Stefan Möller
| 43,069
| 14.9
|  10.4
| 7
|  5
|-
| bgcolor=| 
| align=left| Alliance 90/The Greens (Grüne)
| align=left| Astrid Rothe-Beinlich
| 34,318
| 11.8
|  2.1
| 6
|  1
|-
| 
| align=left| Better City Erfurt (M)
| align=left| Tina Morgenroth
| 21,303
| 7.3
| New
| 4
| New
|-
| bgcolor=| 
| align=left| Free Democratic Party (FDP)
| align=left| Thomas Kemmerich
| 15,513
| 5.4
|  2.9
| 3
|  2
|-
| bgcolor=| 
| align=left| Free Voters (FW)
| align=left| Daniel Stassny
| 14,454
| 5.0
|  1.6
| 2
| ±0
|-
| bgcolor=| 
| align=left| Pirate Party Germany (Piraten)
| align=left| Peter Städter
| 5,472
| 1.9
|  0.2
| 1
| ±0
|-
| bgcolor=#0B6623| 
| align=left| The III. Path
| align=left| Enrico Biczysko
| 1,635
| 0.6
| New
| 0
| New
|-
! colspan=3| Valid votes
! 97,492
! 96.8
! 
! 
! 
|-
! colspan=3| Invalid votes
! 3,232
! 3.2
! 
! 
! 
|-
! colspan=3| Total
! 100,724
! 100.0
! 
! 50
! ±0
|-
! colspan=3| Electorate/voter turnout
! 172,389
! 58.4
!  11.1
! 
! 
|-
| colspan=8| Source: Wahlen in Thüringen
|}

Twin towns – sister cities

Erfurt is twinned with:

 Győr, Hungary (1971)
 Vilnius, Lithuania (1972)
 Kalisz, Poland (1982)
 Mainz, Germany (1988)
 Lille, France (1991)
 Shawnee, United States (1993)
 San Miguel de Tucumán, Argentina (1993)
 Lovech, Bulgaria (1996)
 Haifa, Israel (2000)
 Xuzhou, China (2005)
 Kati, Mali (2011)

Notable people 
See: List of people from Erfurt

Footnotes

References

Bibliography

External links 

 Erfurt City Panoramas – Panoramic Views and virtual Tours
 Kraemerbruecke
 Sister City (since 1993) with Shawnee, Kansas
 World Shots. Germany. Erfurt. – Collection of photographs (English, Russian, Hebrew)
 Memorial and Museum Topf & Sons.  – Builders of the Auschwitz Oven
Old maps of Erfurt - Eran Laor Cartographic Collection, The National Library of Israel in Historic Cities Research Project

 
German state capitals
Medieval German architecture
Members of the Hanseatic League
Holocaust locations in Germany